Romela Dadayan is a member of the National Assembly of Nagorno-Karabakh.

References

External links

Politicians from the Republic of Artsakh